Fort Foster may refer to:

Fort Foster, a 19th-century fortification in Florida
Fort Foster (Kittery, Maine), built in 1872 and now a public park
Fort Foster (Washington County, Maine), an earthworks of the American Revolutionary War near Machias